Wilfred Adams Russell (1874 – 8 January 1932), was an Australian politician. He was a Member of the Queensland Legislative Assembly.

Early life and education
Russell was born in Queensland in 1874 and educated in New South Wales, where he later acquired pastoral and agricultural interests.

Pastoralism

In 1909 he acquired an interest in Dalmally Station near Roma and took up residence there in 1910. He further extended his pastoral interests with the acquisition of properties at Cunnamulla and Jimbour Station. Jimbour was purchased from Charles Whippell. Title was transferred to Russell in January 1925. He pioneered the use of motorised livestock transport in the 1920s.

Politics
Like the Bells before him, Russell of Jimbour became involved in local politics. He served as an alderman of the Dalby Town council and as the member for Dalby in the Queensland Legislative Assembly from 1926 until his death in 1932. In 1927 he donated part of the Bunya Mountains National Park to the community. In 1931 he was involved in the acquisition of part of Lake Broadwater as a national park.

Family
Russell was married to Millicent Baldwin of Tamworth. They had five children, 2 sons and 3 daughters. Muriel, Joan, Henry, Charles and Eileen.

External links
 Jimbour website

References

1874 births
1932 deaths
Australian Anglicans
Australian pastoralists
Members of the Queensland Legislative Assembly
People from Rockhampton
Date of death unknown
Date of death missing